Palestine is an unincorporated community in Harrison Township, Kosciusko County, in the U.S. state of Indiana.

History
Palestine was laid out in 1837. It was named for the ancient area of Palestine. A post office was established at Palestine in 1839, and remained in operation until it was discontinued in 1903.

Geography
Palestine is located at  along State Road 25 six miles southwest of the city of Warsaw. It occupies the western shore of Palestine Lake. Trimble Creek joins the lake at the northern edge of town.

References

Unincorporated communities in Kosciusko County, Indiana
Unincorporated communities in Indiana
Populated places established in 1837
1837 establishments in Indiana